Gérard Duménil (born 12 October 1942) is a French political economist. He is a former Research Director at the Centre National de la Recherche Scientifique (CNRS), in France.

Publications

References 

1942 births
Living people
French economists
Marxian economists
Research directors of the French National Centre for Scientific Research